The 2009 Moorilla Hobart International was a women's tennis tournament played on outdoor hard courts. It was the 16th edition of the event and part of the WTA International tournaments of the 2009 WTA Tour. It took place at the Hobart International Tennis Centre in Hobart, Australia from 12 through 18 January 2009. Unseeded Petra Kvitová won the singles title.

Finals

Singles

 Petra Kvitová defeated  Iveta Benešová, 7–5, 6–1
It was Kvitová's first title of her career.

Doubles

 Gisela Dulko /  Flavia Pennetta defeated  Alona Bondarenko /  Kateryna Bondarenko, 6–2, 7–6(7–4)

References

External links
WTA – Hobart Tournament details

 
Moorilla Hobart International
Moorilla Hobart International
Hobart International